Richard (Dick) May (November 7, 1930June 9, 2009) was a NASCAR driver who competed in 185 races in the NASCAR Grand National/Winston Cup Series between 1967 and 1985.

Racing career
May began his racing career at the Watertown Speedway, where he was 1962 Track Champion. In the 1975 running of the Mason-Dixon 500, May drove five different cars but did not finish the race. 
May was inducted into the Northeast Dirt Modified Hall of Fame in 2007.

Death
On June 9, 2009, May died following a long illness.

Motorsports career results

Grand National Series

Winston Cup Series

References

External links
 

1930 births
2009 deaths
NASCAR drivers
People from Cabarrus County, North Carolina
Racing drivers from New York (state)
People from Ithaca, New York